The Théâtre Saint-Georges is a theatre in the French capital Paris, located on the Rue Saint-Georges from which it takes its name. Designed by the architect Charles Siclis, it was constructed on the site of a former mansion and opened in 1929. Originally it was managed by Camille Choisy, before he handed it over to Benoît-Léon Deutsch who successfully staged Boulevard comedies during the 1930s including Georges Berr and Louis Verneuil's The Train for Venice.

References

Bibliography
 Pride, Leo Bryan. International Theatre Directory: A World Directory of the Theatre and Performing Arts. Simon and Schuster, 1973.
 Stoddard, Richard . Theatre and Cinema Architecture: A Guide to Information Sources. Gale Research Company, 1978.

Theatres in Paris
Theatres completed in 1929
1929 establishments in France